The Performance Turbine Legend is an American sports monoplane designed by Performance Aircraft for sale as a kit for amateur construction.

Design and development
The Legend is a streamlined low-wing monoplane mainly constructed of carbon-fiber-reinforced polymer. It has swept-back tail surfaces with a mid-mounted tailplane and tapered wings, with optional winglets. The prototype was powered by a  Chevrolet V-8 engine with a three-bladed tractor propeller and a ventral air-scoop, the Turbine Legend has a  Walter M601 turboprop with a three-bladed tractor propeller. The Legend has a retractable tricycle landing gear; the mainwheels retract inwards and the nosewheel rearwards. The enclosed cockpit has room for two persons in tandem seats with dual controls and has a rear-hinged, upward-opening, canopy with a fixed windscreen.

The Legend was first flown in 1996 by Performance Aircraft and the prototype was converted into a Turbine Legend in 1999.

The assets of Performance Aircraft were taken over by Lanny Rundell to be marketed by Legend Aircraft of Winnsboro, Louisiana.

Operational history
In a March 2020 review for Kitplanes, writer Doug Rozendaal described the takeoff: "the acceleration is like a jet fighter." He also praised the handling and the fit and finish of the design.

Variants
Legend
Piston-engined variant, powered by a  Chevrolet V-8 automotive conversion piston engine.

Turbine Legend
Turboprop-engined variant, powered by a  Walter M601 turboprop engine.

JC 100
A Turbine Legend built by Toys 4 Boys in 2000, designated the JC 100

Turbine Legend (Garrett Edition)
A Turbine Legend was built by Innovative Wings Inc. utilizing a  Garrett TPE331-10 engine.

Turbine Legend Venom
A military version marketed by Venom Military Aircraft and intended for the training and light attack roles. No sales have yet been announced.

Specifications (Turbine Legend)

References

Notes

Bibliography

External links

Performance Aircraft aircraft
1990s United States civil utility aircraft
Homebuilt aircraft
Single-engined tractor aircraft